is a female Japanese long-distance runner from Josai University. She won first place at the 2009 World University Games's Half Marathon for Women.

References

Living people
Josai University alumni
1988 births
Japanese female long-distance runners
Universiade medalists in athletics (track and field)
Universiade gold medalists for Japan
Medalists at the 2009 Summer Universiade
20th-century Japanese women
21st-century Japanese women